Deep in My Heart may refer to:
Deep in My Heart (1954 film), 1954 American biographical musical film 
Deep in My Heart (1999 film), 1999 American television film
"Deep in My Heart" (song), 1990
 "Deep in My Heart", a song by Britney Spears from the album ...Baby One More Time, 1999